Auriol Hazel Dawn Stevens (born 4 November 1940) is a British journalist, and former editor of the Times Higher Education Supplement, the leading national publication for UK universities.

Early life
She was the daughter of Captain Barry Stevens of the Royal Navy, growing up in Bishop's Waltham. She attended Somerville College, Oxford.

Career
From 1962 to 1972 she was a freelance journalist, often writing for The Guardian. From 1972 to 1978 she worked for the Times Education Supplement, becoming deputy editor. From 1978 to 1983 she was an education correspondent for The Observer.

From 1983 to 1986 she was a presenter on the political television series A Week in Politics on Channel 4. From 1986 to 1992 she was director of the Universities Information Unit of the Committee of Vice-Chancellors and Principals (now Universities UK).

Times Higher Education Supplement
She was editor of the Times Higher Education Supplement from 1992 to 2002. She replaced Sir Peter Scott, who became professor of education at the University of Leeds. She left The Times at the end of May 2002. She is on the Ethics Committee of the University of Essex.

Personal life
She married Professor Hugh Stephenson on 10 August 1962 at Chelsea Old Church; they divorced in 1987 and have two sons and a daughter. Her first husband was editor of the New Statesman from 1982 to 1986 and professor of journalism at City, University of London, and son of Sir Hugh Stephenson, and brother of Jonathan Stephenson, the chairman from 1995 to 1998 of the Social Democratic and Labour Party.

She lives in Wivenhoe in north-east Essex.

Publications
 Clever Children in Comprehensive Schools, 1978, Penguin Books, 
 The State of the Universities, 1991
 Women in the Media, 1998

References

External links
 BFI

1940 births
Alumni of Somerville College, Oxford
British magazine editors
British women journalists
Channel 4 people
People associated with the University of Essex
People from Bishop's Waltham
People from Wivenhoe
The Observer people
Living people
Women magazine editors